Apotomis semifasciana, the short-barred grey marble, is a moth of the family Tortricidae. It was first described by the English entomologist Adrian Hardy Haworth in 1811.

Life cycle
Ova
The eggs are laid on willows (Salix species).

Larva
The larva is green; dorsal and subdorsal lines darker; head and plate of 2 yellowish-green. The larvae feed on the catkins and later the leaves of willows in May and June.

Pupa
The blackish brown pupa can be found in a silken cocoon, spun between two leaves of the foodpant in June and July.

Imago
The wingspan is 17–20 mm. The head and thorax are grey. The forewings are grey, closely striated with whitish . The basal patch and a subtriangular central costal blotch are fuscous, black-marked, the apex of blotch truncate, marked with a black dash. The costa posteriorly is fuscous-spotted with a darker black-dotted subterminal mark in middle. The  hindwings are grey, darker posteriorly.
 Julius von Kennel provides a full description. 

Adults are on wing from July to August, flying from late evening onwards and coming to light and sugar.  . During the day they rest in foliage and are not usually easily disturbed.

Distribution
It is found in most of Europe, from Ireland to Russia.

Notes
The flight season refers to Great Britain and Ireland. This may vary in other parts of the range.

References

External links
 UKMoths
 Fauna Europaea
 

Olethreutini
Moths described in 1811
Moths of Asia
Tortricidae of Europe
Taxa named by Jacob Hübner

no:Apotomis infida